Bambous is a small town in Mauritius located in the Rivière Noire District. The village is administered by the Bambous Village Council under the aegis of the Rivière Noire District Council. According to the census made by Statistics Mauritius in 2011, the population was at 15,345.

Sports 
The local football team is the Bambous Etoile de L'ouest S.C, the village host a multi-purpose sports venue, the Stade Germain Comarmond, the venue has hosted various international competitions such as the 2006 African Championships in Athletics and 2009 African Junior Athletics Championships.

See also 
 Districts of Mauritius
 List of places in Mauritius

References